Zumaglia is a comune (municipality) in the Province of Biella in the Italian region Piedmont, located about  northeast of Turin and about  southeast of Biella.

Zumaglia borders the following municipalities: Biella, Pettinengo, Ronco Biellese.

Demographic evolution

See also
Zumaglia Castle

References

Cities and towns in Piedmont